Andrew Turnbull (1718 – March 13, 1792) was a Scottish physician and diplomat who served as the British consul at Smyrna, Ottoman Empire. In 1768, he founded the colony of New Smyrna, Florida, named in honor of his wife's birthplace, the ancient Greek city of Smyrna on the Aegean coast of Anatolia. Turnbull was married to Gracia Dura Bin (some sources give her name as Maria Gracia Rubini), the daughter of a Greek merchant from Smyrna. His colony was located in the province of British East Florida, and encompassed some 101,400 acres (410 km); it was nearly three times the size of the colony at Jamestown.

In partnership with Sir William Duncan he secured a grant of 40,000 acres (160 km) of land on the east coast of the peninsula, with the requirement from the British government that it be settled within 10 years in the proportion of one person for every . In 1765 he sailed to St. Augustine, Florida, the capital of the province, and secured the grant from Governor James Grant. Turnbull then returned to England, secured financing for his forthcoming venture through bounties from the government and the Board of Trade, and subsequently sailed for the Mediterranean to find colonists "for a Tract of Land in East Florida on which I might settle a small Colony of Greeks," as Turnbull explained in a letter to Lord Shelburne.

One of Turnbull's prospective partners in the venture was Francis Levett, an English factor working in Livorno for the Levant Company. From a powerful English mercantile family with extensive trading connections, Levett hoped to use his influence in the Levant to supply Greek laborers to Turnbull's new colony. Levett then left London, where he had relocated, and settled in British East Florida, where he was granted a  plantation by Governor Grant. His collaboration with Turnbull apparently came to naught.

In June 1767, Turnbull arrived with his ships in the Mediterranean, where he visited Mahon, Menorca; Livorno, Italy; Smyrna, Asia Minor; Melos, Mani, Koroni, Methoni in Greece; Crete; Santorini; and Corsica. He encountered opposition from French, Italian, and Turkish authorities, who did not want to see their subjects leave, but after persistent efforts, he finally rounded up over 1,400 colonists, the majority from Menorca, and left for his new colony in East Florida.

Turnbull's settlers eventually succeeded in producing crops of high quality indigo, hemp and sugarcane for making rum, but the plantation suffered major losses due to insect-borne diseases and Native American raids. Meanwhile, tensions grew between Turnbull and the colonists because of his neglect and mistreatment by his overseers. The remaining colonists marched north in 1777 to St. Augustine along the King's Road to complain of this mistreatment to Governor Patrick Tonyn, and permanently abandoned New Smyrna when he offered them sanctuary. In 1783 Florida was returned to the Spanish, and Turnbull left his plantation to retire in Charleston, South Carolina.

References

Honors
 

1718 births
1792 deaths
American city founders
Florida pioneers
British diplomats
New Smyrna Beach, Florida
People of pre-statehood Florida